Krenitsyn, spelt Krenitzin in the United States, may refer to:

Pyotr Krenitsyn, a Russian explorer and Captain/Lieutenant of the Imperial Russian Navy
The highest peak on Onekotan Island, located in the midst of the Tao-Rusyr Caldera
The Krenitzin Islands in Alaska
Cape Krenitzin at the SW end of the Alaska Peninsula